The Sunday Times Rich List 2007 was published on 29 April 2007. The online edition was published on 30 April 2007.

Since 1989, the UK national Sunday newspaper The Sunday Times (sister paper to The Times) has published an annual magazine supplement to the newspaper called the Sunday Times Rich List. The list is based on an estimate of the minimum wealth of the richest 1,000 people or families in the United Kingdom as of January of that year. A separate section lists the 250 richest Irish, including both Northern Ireland and the Republic of Ireland.

The top three places in the list were unchanged from the previous year. One of the most notable changes was the newspaper's revaluation of property developer Nasser David Khalili, placed 5th, with an estimated fortune of 5.8 billion. This included an estimated value of £4.5 billion for his art collection (an increase of £500 million from 2006) which was questioned by other sources.

Top 12 fortunes

See also
List of billionaires (2007)

References

External links
 Sunday Times Rich List 2007 online edition
 Chat lines boss enters Sunday Times Rich List Times Online, 26 April 2007
 Ratcliffe in richest top 10 Times Online, 26 April 2007

Sunday Times Rich List
2007 in the United Kingdom